King of Stage is the debut solo album by American R&B singer Bobby Brown. Following his exit from New Edition, and at 16, Brown signed a solo deal with the group's label MCA Records, which had earlier promised Brown a solo deal if he decided to leave New Edition. His first solo album was released in 1986.

The album spawned the singles "Girlfriend", "Seventeen", and "Girl Next Door". None of the singles were major US Hot 100 hits, however, Brown had a number-one R&B hit with the first single, the ballad, "Girlfriend".

Production
The album was produced by Larry Blackmon and John Luongo; Brown and Luongo produced the title track. Brown was unhappy with the production, and elected to go with proven producers for his next album.

Reception

AllMusic wrote that "as enjoyable as the Blackmon-produced tracks are, top honors must go to 'Seventeen' -- a riveting account of a teenage mother who turns to drugs and prostitution -- and the unapologetically sentimental, '70s-like soul ballad 'Girlfriend'." The Los Angeles Times called the album "an ill-conceived mess" marked by a "lack of focus, inconsistent production and mostly inferior material." The Boston Globe deemed it "a versatile blend of street funk, rap and ballads."

Track listing
"Girlfriend" – 6:16 (Kirk Crumpler, Lee Peters, Larry White)
"Girl Next Door" – 4:08 (Melvin Wells)
"Baby, I Wanna Tell You Something" – 3:47 (Larry Blackmon, Tomi Jenkins, Nathan Leftenant)
"You Ain't Been Loved Right" – 5:07 (Michael Lovesmith)
"King of Stage" – 5:07 (John Luongo, Khris Kellow, Doctor Ice)
"Love Obsession" – 4:43 (Steve Lindley, Richard Nuttal, Ian Legall)
"Spending Time" – 3:58 (Allen N. Jones)
"Seventeen" – 4:17 (Robert Brookins, Tony Haynes)
"Your Tender Romance" – (Paul Jackson Jr., Tony Haynes) 5:10

Personnel
Adapted from liner notes
Bobby Brown: Main Vocals
Lee Peters, Olie Bowlds, Richard Aquon, Allyson Williams, Tomi Jenkins, Marlena Jeter, Marva King, Angel Eve, Lance "Romance" Matthews, Scopin Scott, Smooth Bee, Victor Lee-Love, Debbie Kole, Jilliann, Willie Morris, Lena Seinday, Sue Ann, Mont Seward: Vocal Backing
Paul Jackson Jr.: Guitars, Keyboards, Bass
Melvin Wells: Guitars, Keyboards
Larry White: Guitars, Keyboards, Bass, Percussion, Vocal Backing
Kevin Choken, Emilio Conesa: Guitars
Robert Brookins, Khris Kellow, Michael Lovesmith, Grady Wilkins: Keyboards, Vocal Backing
Roland Ramos: Percussion
Maurice Bailey: Scratching
Melicio "The Cat" Magdaluyo: Saxophone

Charts

Singles

References

External links
 Bobby Brown-King Of Stage at Discogs

1986 debut albums
Bobby Brown albums
MCA Records albums